Nuwan Kavinda (born 22 July 1992) is a Sri Lankan cricketer. He made his first-class debut for Saracens Sports Club in the 2011–12 Premier Trophy on 20 January 2012.

See also
 List of Chilaw Marians Cricket Club players

References

External links
 

1992 births
Living people
Sri Lankan cricketers
Chilaw Marians Cricket Club cricketers
Saracens Sports Club cricketers
Place of birth missing (living people)